Cymindis nobilis is a species of ground beetle in the subfamily Harpalinae. It was described by Andrewes in 1933.

References

nobilis
Beetles described in 1933